William Coldrick (20 January 1894 – 15 September 1975) was a Labour Co-operative politician in the United Kingdom.

He was elected as Member of Parliament for Bristol North at the 1945 general election.  When that constituency was abolished in boundary changes for the 1950 general election, he was returned to Parliament for the new Bristol North East constituency. He was defeated at the 1959 general election by the Conservative and National Liberal candidate Alan Hopkins.

He was Chairman of the Co-operative Party from 1945 to 1955 and was Sheriff of Bristol in 1964.  He was briefly in prison during the General Strike of 1926 with Arthur Jenkins, the father of Roy Jenkins.  He died in 1975 aged 81.

References 

1894 births
1975 deaths
Labour Co-operative MPs for English constituencies
UK MPs 1945–1950
UK MPs 1950–1951
UK MPs 1951–1955
UK MPs 1955–1959
High Sheriffs of Bristol